The Deutsche Reichspartei (DRP, German Reich Party, German Imperial Party or German Empire Party) was a nationalist, far-right and later Neo-Nazi political party in West Germany. It was founded in 1950 from the German Right Party, which had been set up in Lower Saxony in 1946 and had five members in the first Bundestag.

Formation
The DRP was established in 1950 when the majority of the Deutsche Rechtspartei members of the Bundestag decided to establish a more formal party network under the DRP name. The new party absorbed the "National Democrats", a splinter group from Hesse. The party took its name from an earlier group of the same name that had existed during the German Empire period. The initial three deputy chairmen, Wilhelm Meinberg, Otto Hess and Heinrich Kunstmann, had all been members of the Nazi Party. From 1951 the group published its own newspaper Reichsruf ("Call of the Reich").

Development
The party moved towards explicit neo-Nazism in 1952, when the Socialist Reich Party (SRP) was declared unconstitutional and disbanded by the Federal Constitutional Court of Germany. Much of its membership then joined the DRP. The membership of Hans-Ulrich Rudel in 1953 was seen as marking out the party as the new force of neo-Nazism and he enjoyed close ties to Savitri Devi and Nazi mysticism.

Stability under chancellor Konrad Adenauer of the Christian Democratic Union and the growth experienced during the Wirtschaftswunder meant that the DRP struggled for support, averaging around only 1% of the national votes in the federal elections of 1953, 1957 and 1961. The party's only major breakthrough came in 1959 in the regional election for Rhineland-Palatinate, where it won 5.1% of the vote and thus was able to send deputies to the assembly.

In 1962 the party took part in an international conference of far-right groups hosted in Venice by Oswald Mosley and signed up as members of his National Party of Europe. This initiative did not take off as Mosley had hoped, however, as few of the member parties, including the DRP, were interested in changing their name to National Party of Europe, as he had hoped they would. One of the party's last acts in 1964 saw it sponsor a tour of Germany by controversial American historian David Hoggan.

Dissolution
The lack of national success however saw the leaders of the DRP seek to extend their influence further, and they made contact with the leaders of other rightist parties such as the German Party and its successor (following that organisation's merger with the All-German Bloc/League of Expellees and Deprived of Rights), the Gesamtdeutsche Partei seeking close ties. It was soon decided that a more formal union with other rightist groups was desirable. They held their final party conference in Bonn in 1964 in which they voted to form a new union of "national democratic forces". The party was symbolically liquidated, with the National Democratic Party of Germany (NPD) established immediately afterwards.

References

German nationalist political parties
Defunct political parties in Germany
Political parties established in 1950
Far-right political parties in Germany
Fascist parties in Germany
Political parties disestablished in 1964
1950 establishments in West Germany
Neo-Nazism in Germany
Anti-communist parties